Nyamware is a settlement in Kenya's Nyanza Province. It is located in Kadibo division, Nyando constituency, Kisumu county. Settlement in this place dates back to 1867. It serves as a beach along one of the tributaries of river Nyando. Fishing is the main economic activity in this area and buyers come as far as Kisumu town to buy fish from traders. Some of the common fishes found in this place are omena (dagaa), mbuta (nile perch), tilapia (ng'ege), kamongo (mudfish), mumi (catfish) among other species. Beach management commonly referred to as BM by the locals offers administrative roles alongside area assistant chief and chief. The current chief is Mark Dero Nyadianga, an energetic and straightforward person. In the past, this place was inaccessible during rainy season, however, with the devolution, this place has a murram road from Alendu Shopping centre. With this road, Nyamware is accessible.

1. Gabriel Mboche Obute 
2.Shadrack Omondi Sagwe

References 

Populated places in Nyanza Province
1867 establishments in Africa